Plum Creek is the primary outflow for the Plum Lakes (49°37′51″N, 100°43′39″W) and travels in an easterly direction for about 28 kilometres until it meets up with the Souris River, which is part of the Hudson Bay drainage basin, at the community of Souris in the Canadian province of Manitoba. Plum Lakes and the beginning of Plum Creek are in the Rural Municipality of Sifton and the mouth is in the Municipality of Souris – Glenwood.

The course of Plum Creek flows north-east past the Souris Sand Hills then back east-southeast towards the Souris River in a gentle arc. While Plum Creek itself is relatively short with no notable tributaries along its  course, it has a large drainage basin that goes as far west and north as Grenfell, Saskatchewan.

The source for Plum Creek is Plum Lakes. The inflows for the Plum Lakes, which are a group of lakes to the south and east of Oak Lake, include Maple Lake (fed by Stony Creek), Bell Creek, and Oak Lake. Oak Lake, through Oak Lake Dam (49°38′27″N, 100°45′8″W), is the primary inflow for the Plum Lakes. Along the western side of Oak Lake is Oak Lake Marsh, which is where Oak Lake's primary inflow, Pipestone Creek, enters the lake. Pipestone Creek drains much of the northern and eastern portions of Moose Mountain Upland in Saskatchewan and as far north and west as Grenfell, Saskatchewan.

Maple Lake, Plum Lakes, Lauder Sand Hills, Oak Lake, Oak Lake Marsh (which is almost 4 times the size of Oak Lake itself), and Plum Creek are all part of Important Bird Area (IBA) Canada called Oak Lake / Plum Lakes Area.

Concrete Bowstring Arch Bridge No. 734
The Concrete Bowstring Arch Bridge No. 734 is an abandoned concrete arch bridge over Plum Creek, west of Souris in the Municipality of Souris-Glenwood. It was built in 1921 as part of Provincial Trunk Highway #2 and is now part of the Canadian Register of Historic Places and on the list of historic places in Manitoba. Highway 2 has since been relocated farther south.

See also
List of rivers of Manitoba
List of protected areas of Manitoba
Oak Lake Aquifer

References

Rivers of Manitoba
Tributaries of Hudson Bay
Souris River